The Democratic Republic of the Congo competed at the 2018 Summer Youth Olympics in Buenos Aires, Argentina from 6 October to 18 October 2018.

Competitors

Athletics

One athlete qualified for the games.

Girls

Beach volleyball

Girls

Judo

1 athlete qualified for judo at the games.

Individual

Team

Taekwondo

Boys

References

2018 in the Democratic Republic of the Congo sport
Nations at the 2018 Summer Youth Olympics
Democratic Republic of the Congo at the Youth Olympics